Torosomyia is a genus of flies in the family Tachinidae.

Species
T. parallela Reinhard, 1935

References

Exoristinae
Diptera of Asia
Diptera of North America
Tachinidae genera